Dărmănești is a commune located in Suceava County, Bukovina, northeastern Romania. It is composed of six villages: namely Călinești, Călinești-Vasilache, Dănila, Dărmănești, Măriței (the commune center), and Mărițeia Mică.

Gallery

References 

Communes in Suceava County
Localities in Southern Bukovina